Flade is a surname. Notable people with the surname include:

Hermann Flade (1932–1980), German political scientist
Klaus-Dietrich Flade (born 1952), German pilot
Michael Flade (born 1975), German composer
Tina Flade, German dancer
Uwe Flade, German music video director and entrepreneur